Plasma or plasm may refer to:

Science
 Plasma (physics), one of the four fundamental states of matter
 Plasma (mineral), a green translucent silica mineral
 Quark–gluon plasma, a state of matter in quantum chromodynamics

Biology
 Blood plasma, the yellow-colored liquid component of blood, in which blood cells are suspended
 Cytoplasm, a jelly-like substance that fills cells, suspends and protects organelles 
 Germ plasm, a zone in the cytoplasm determining germ cells
 Germplasm, describes a collection of genetic resources for an organism
 Milk plasma or whey, the liquid remaining after milk has been curdled and strained
 Nucleoplasm, a highly viscous liquid that surrounds the chromosomes and nucleoli
 Plasma cell, white blood cells that secrete large volumes of antibodies
 Protoplasm, the entire living substance inside the cell membrane or cell wall

Technology
 Plasma (engine), a real-time 3D game engine from Cyan Worlds
 Plasma display, a flat-panel electronic visual display technology, commonly used for televisions
 Plasma effect, a computer-based animated visual effect, used in graphics demonstrations
 KDE Plasma (disambiguation), graphical environments provided by KDE

Arts, entertainment and media
 Plasma (album), a 2003 live album by Trey Anastasio
 Plasma Records, a record label
 Team Plasma, a fictional villainous organization from Pokémon Black and White and Pokémon Black 2 and White 2

See also
 Plasma ball (disambiguation)
 Plasma cannon (disambiguation)
 Plasma gun (disambiguation)